Laura Leigh can refer to:

 Laura Hofrichter, actress who is credited as "Laura Leigh" in a number of films including Do Not Disturb
 Laura-Leigh, American actress